Roccavivi is a frazione of San Vincenzo Valle Roveto, in the Province of L'Aquila in the Abruzzo, region of Italy.

Frazioni of San Vincenzo Valle Roveto